Anna Dušková (born 30 December 1999) is a retired Czech figure skater. Competing in pairs with partner Martin Bidař, she is the 2016 World Junior champion, 2016 Youth Olympic silver medalist (individually and in the team event), and 2015 JGP Final silver medalist. As a single skater, she is the 2015 NRW Trophy bronze medalist.

Personal life 
Dušková was born on 30 December 1999 in Nymburk, Czech Republic.

Skating career

Single skating 
Dušková started learning to skate in 2004. She was introduced to the activity at school and then persuaded her mother to let her continue with it.

Competing in ladies' singles, she placed 32nd at the 2014 World Junior Championships in Sofia, Bulgaria. She won the senior bronze medal at the 2015 NRW Trophy.

First few seasons with Bidař 
Dušková and Martin Bidař began skating together as a pair after their coach, Eva Horklová, suggested the idea. Recalling their beginnings, Dušková stated, "It was quite embarrassing at first, because everybody was skating singles and we had to hold hands. We were so young and shy." In the 2011–2012 season, they competed together on the novice national level.

2013–2014 season: Junior international debut 
Dušková/Bidař's ISU Junior Grand Prix (JGP) debut came in the 2013–2014 season; they finished 8th in September 2013 in Košice, Slovakia, and 6th the next month in Ostrava, Czech Republic. In March 2014, the pair placed 10th at the World Junior Championships in Sofia, Bulgaria, having ranked 10th in both segments.

2014–2015 season 
In 2014–2015, Dušková/Bidař continued on the JGP series, finishing 10th in Estonia and 8th in Germany. They came in 8th at the 2015 World Junior Championships in Tallinn, Estonia, after placing 9th in both segments.

2015–2016 season: Gold at World Junior Championships 
Although based mainly in the Czech Republic, Dušková/Bidař also spent some time training in Montreal and Sochi in the summer of 2015 and made another visit to Montreal during the competitive season.

Competing in the 2015 JGP series, Dušková/Bidař won a silver medal in August in Linz, Austria, and finished 4th the following month in Riga, Latvia. The results qualified them for the 2015 JGP Final, held in December 2015 in Barcelona, Spain. Ranked third in the short program and second in the free skate, Dušková/Bidař edged out Russia's Amina Atakhanova / Ilia Spiridonov by 0.33 for the silver medal behind Ekaterina Borisova / Dmitry Sopot, who won gold by a margin of 9.53 points. They became the first Czech pair to step on the podium at a JGP Final.

In February 2016, Dušková/Bidař competed in Hamar, Norway, at the Winter Youth Olympics, placing first in the short program, second in the free skate, and second overall with a total score 2.53 less than Borisova/Sopot. Their silver is the Czech Republic's first Youth Olympic medal in figure skating. In March, Dušková/Bidař won gold at the 2016 World Junior Championships in Debrecen, Hungary. Ranked first in both segments, they outscored two Russian pairs – silver medalists Anastasia Mishina / Vladislav Mirzoev by 9.22 points and bronze medalists Ekaterina Borisova / Dmitry Sopot by 12.82 points – to become the Czech Republic's first World Junior champions in figure skating. They are also the first pair skaters from outside China, Russia, or the United States to win the competition since 2001. On their future plans, Dušková stated that "there will be less and less singles competitions for me. We will concentrate on pairs."

2016–2017 season: Senior debut  
Ahead of the season, Dušková/Bidař spent three weeks training in Montreal before returning to the Czech Republic. Opening their season on the JGP series, the pair won gold at their September event in Ostrava, ahead of Atakhanova/Spiridonov, and then silver the following month in Dresden, behind Mishina/Mirzoev. Later in October, making their senior international debut, they outscored Miriam Ziegler / Severin Kiefer to win the International Cup of Nice. In December, they placed second to Mishina/Mirzoev at the JGP Final in Marseille.

They placed 7th at the 2017 European Championships in Ostrava, and 14th at the 2017 World Championships in Helsinki.

2017–2018 season: Winter Olympics 
In September 2017, Dušková/Bidař competed at the Nebelhorn Trophy, the final qualifying opportunity for the 2018 Winter Olympics. The pair placed 9th and earned a spot for the Czech Republic in the pairs' event at the Olympics.

Dušková injured a knee ligament during a warm-up before training in late October and decided later to undergo an operation. As a result, the pair withdrew from their two Grand Prix assignments – the 2017 Cup of China and 2017 Internationaux de France.

Dušková/Bidař returned to competition at the 2018 Winter Olympics in Pyeongchang, South Korea. They qualified to the free skate by placing 15th in the short program and went on to finish 14th overall. Ranked 13th in the short and 11th in the free, the pair finished 11th at the 2018 World Championships in Milan, Italy. On 27 April 2018, they announced that they had parted ways.

Single skating 
As a single skater, Dušková made her JGP debut in September 2013, placing 12th at an event in Gdańsk, Poland. She competed at the 2014 World Junior Championships in Sofia, Bulgaria but was eliminated after placing 32nd in the short program. During the 2014–15 season, she placed 10th and 14th at her JGP assignments.

In 2015–16, Dušková was 10th at her JGP event in Toruń, Poland. She made her senior international debut in October, finishing 11th at the 2015 Ondrej Nepela Trophy and 6th at the 2015 Ice Challenge, both of which were part of the ISU Challenger Series (CS). In late November, she won the senior bronze medal at the 2015 NRW Trophy in Dortmund Germany.

Programs

With Bidař

Single skating

Competitive highlights 
GP: Grand Prix; CS: Challenger Series; JGP: Junior Grand Prix

With Bidař

Single skating

References

External links 

 
 

1999 births
Czech female pair skaters
Czech female single skaters
Living people
People from Nymburk
Figure skaters at the 2016 Winter Youth Olympics
Figure skaters at the 2018 Winter Olympics
Olympic figure skaters of the Czech Republic
World Junior Figure Skating Championships medalists
Sportspeople from the Central Bohemian Region